This is a list of members of the South Australian Legislative Council from 1865 to 1869.

This was the third Legislative Council to be elected under the Constitution of 1856, which provided for a house consisting of eighteen members to be elected from the whole colony acting as one electoral district "The Province"; that six members, selected by lot, should be replaced at General Elections after four years, another six to be replaced four years later and thenceforth each member should have a term of twelve years. Eight members were elected – six by the "effluxion of time" and two to replace members Forster and Waterhouse who resigned the previous December.

References
Parliament of South Australia — Statistical Record of the Legislature

Members of South Australian parliaments by term
19th-century Australian politicians